The  is a yakuza organization based in Hyogo, Japan.

Overview
The Kobe Yamaguchi-gumi yakuza organization includes Kobe-based Yamaken-gumi, Osaka-based Takumi-gumi, and Kyoyu-kai. They broke away from The Sixth Yamaguchi-gumi in 2015 and formed a new group called Kobe Yamaguchi-gumi. The authorities closely monitored this split to avoid any, try to relax tensions that exist between the groups, since August there has been a slight increase in crimes throughout the country, ranging from shootings to office attacks. It was not until April 15 of 2016, when authorities designated the Kobe Yamaguchi-gumi as a crime syndicate.

See also
 List of Yakuza syndicates

References

Organizations established in 2015
2015 establishments in Japan
Yakuza groups